The Boston Gaol (1635–1822) was a jail in the center of Boston, Massachusetts, located off Court Street, in the block bounded by School, Washington and Tremont Streets. It was rebuilt several times on the same site, before finally moving to the West End in 1822. Prisoners included Quakers, "witches," pirates, murderers, rebels, debtors, and newspaper editors.

History
"Opened in 1635, the Boston Gaol served as Massachusetts' sole prison for eighteen years. ... As settlers fanned out into the wilderness, organizing new townships as they went, local facilities for incarceration sprang up elsewhere." The Boston Gaol sat on Prison Lane (1634–1708), which became later known as Queen Street (1708–1788), and then Court Street (from 1788). Around 1689, "the old stone gaol on Prison Lane [had] ... outer walls ... of stone three feet thick, its unglazed windows barred with iron, 'the cells partitioned off with plank, the doors covered with iron spikes, the passage-ways like the dark valley of the shadow of death.'" In 1704, a new building replaced the old on the same site.

"The prison and its dungeon were considerably repaired after the great fire of 1711, in that neighborhood, which destroyed the town house and first church. The keeper's house was also renovated." "The keys of the building were twelve to eighteen inches long and were expressive of the formidable character of the jail, the walls of which were three feet thick." "There is no reason to suppose that Boston Jail was any worse than most other prisons of that period. But that it was a forbidding place is amply attested by Daniel Fowle, the Boston printer, in his "Total Eclipse of Liberty:" ... 'If there is any such thing as a hell upon earth, I think this place is the nearest resemblance of any I can conceive of.'" "A new building designed by Governor Bernard replaced [the old] in 1767."

"The Massachusetts Charitable Society, at their quarterly meeting last Monday evening [in December 1797], unanimously voted a blanket for each prisoner now confined in Boston gaol, and as much fuel as will be necessary to keep them comfortable during the inclemency of the season." In 1805 "the sons of misfortune and penury, the debtors, now in Boston gaol, partook of the joys of Independence, on the 4th inst. The liberality of several gentlemen afforded them a handsome repast; and a number of appropriate toasts were given on the occasion."

By 1807 the "county gaol" appeared as "a plain stone building of considerable strength," located "in the rear of the court-house."  "The jail [was] a three story building with corridors on the outside of the upper stories, in which were the prisoners confined for debt." In December 1819, there were "now confined in this gaol, poor debtors and poor criminals, as follows: 95 men, 29 women—total: 124. Of whom are destitute of clothing 19 men and 20 women." Through the years, gaol keepers included Mr. Salter (c. 1662); Richard Brackett (c. 1665); Seth Smith (c. 1711); William Young (c. 1740); Oliver Hartshorn (c. 1796).

The Leverett-street jail opened in 1822, replacing the old prison off Court Street. "In 1823 the old gaol was taken down, and its materials were partly used in constructing the gun house and ward room on Thacher Street" in the North End.

Inmates

See also
 Leverett Street Jail (1822–1851)

Images

References

Further reading

 
 
 Suffolk County Gaol. New-England Galaxy & Masonic Magazine; 06-18-1819.
  p. 635.
 

Former buildings and structures in Boston
1635 establishments in Massachusetts
1822 disestablishments in Massachusetts
History of Boston
19th century in Boston
18th century in Boston
17th century in Boston
Defunct prisons in Massachusetts
Financial District, Boston
Jails in Massachusetts
Debtors' prisons
Government buildings in Boston